Contactless payment systems are credit cards and debit cards, key fobs, smart cards, or other devices, including smartphones and other mobile devices, that use radio-frequency identification (RFID) or near-field communication (NFC, e.g. Samsung Pay, Apple Pay, Google Pay, Fitbit Pay, or any bank mobile application that supports contactless) for making secure payments. The embedded integrated circuit chip and antenna enable consumers to wave their card, fob, or handheld device over a reader at the point of sale terminal.  Contactless payments are made in close physical proximity, unlike other types of mobile payments which use broad-area cellular or WiFi networks and do not involve close physical proximity.

EMV is a common standard used by major credit card and smartphone companies for use in general commerce. Contactless smart cards that function as  stored-value cards are becoming popular for use as transit system farecards, such as the Oyster card or RioCard.  These can often store non-currency value (such as monthly passes), in additional to fare value purchased with cash or electronic payment.

Tokenisation is a newer concept of encapsulating a card issuers details within a hardware device application such as via Apple Pay app on iPhones.

Some suppliers claim that transactions can be almost twice as fast as a conventional cash, credit, or debit card purchase. Because no signature or PIN verification is typically required, contactless purchases are usually limited to small value sales. Lack of authentication provides a window during which fraudulent purchases can be made while the card owner is unaware of the card's loss.
Major financial institutions and multinational corporations now offer contactless payment systems to customers as contactless credit cards have become widespread in the U.S., U.K., Japan, Germany, Canada, Australia, France, the Netherlands, etc., as consumers are likely to spend more money using their cards due to the ease of small transactions. With contactless cards growing in numbers and percentages of adoption, the number of payments by this method had increased significantly since the spending limit was raised. Purchases made by card now surpass those made by cash and account for approximately one-third of all card transactions in countries like the UK. Contactless payments specifically have become increasingly popular, accounting for 4 out of 5 point-of-sale purchases in Australia as of 2019. Card issuers indicate that they will increase the availability of contactless cards to consumers. There are over 58 million contactless-enabled cards and over 147,000 terminals in use in the UK alone,  VISA estimated that there would be 300 million contactless cards issued in the US by the end of 2020, up from the predicted 100 million at the end of 2019.

History

1990s—2000s
Mobil was one of the most notable early adopters of a similar technology, and offered their "Speedpass" contactless payment system for participating Mobil gas stations as early as 1997. Although Mobil has since merged with Exxon, the service is still offered at many of ExxonMobil's stations. Freedompay also had early wins in the contactless space with Bank of America and McDonald's.

In 2002, Philips teamed up with Sony to elaborate the NFC standard. Then Philips Semiconductors applied for the six fundamental patents of NFC, invented by the Austrian and French engineers Franz Amtmann and Philippe Maugars who received the European Inventor Award in 2015.

In July 2004, Sony, who had implemented the contactless RFID smart card FeliCa in Japan, introduced the  system (literal translation: "wallet-phone") developed with the mobile phone operator NTT DoCoMo on multiple FeliCa systems such as Edy and, on 28 January 2006, on Mobile Suica used primarily on the railway networks owned by JR East.

In May 2005, after some experimentation in the Netherlands, the contactless deferred payment at the end of each month, after the registration of the trips aboard with a contactless mobile phone on the client's account, was first experimented in Germany during 6 months on the tramways and bus of Hanau with the Nokia 3220 using the NFC standard of Philips and Sony.

In October 2005, the immediate contactless payment was first experimented in France in Caen during 6 months with a Samsung NFC smartphone by Orange in collaboration with Philips Semiconductors in the Cofinoga shops (Galeries Lafayette, Monoprix) and Vinci parkings. For the first time, thanks to "Fly Tag", the system allowed to receive as well audiovisual informations, like bus timetables or cinema trailers from the concerned services. In June 2007, the payment with a contactless bank card was tested at the FNAC of La Défense in Paris and from 19 November 2007 to 2009 in some shops of Caen and Strasbourg, this time with smartphones NFC, provided by four operators (Orange, Bouygues Telecom, SFR and NRJ Mobile). On 5 November 2007, Orange and the transport societies SNCF and Keolis associated themselves for a 2 months experimentation with smartphones in Rennes in the metro, bus and TER trains.

The first contactless cards in the UK were issued by Barclaycard in September 2007. PayPass trialed the world's first NFC-enabled phone, the Nokia 6131 NFC, in New York in 2007.

In March 2008, Eat became the first restaurant chain to adopt contactless.

On 19 January 2009, NFC is used in transports for the first time in the world by China Unicom and Yucheng Transportation Card with Changhong DG28 and F4 mobile phones in the tramways and bus of Chongqing in China.

2010s
In January 2010, Barclaycard partnered with mobile phone firm Orange, to launch a contactless credit card in the UK. Orange and Barclaycard also announced in 2009 that they would be launching a mobile phone with contactless technology.

After a test conducted from October 2005 to November 2006 with 27 users, on 21 May 2010, the transport authority of Nice Régie Lignes d'Azur was the first public transport provider in Europe to add definitely to its own offer a contactless payment on its tramways and bus network either with a NFC bank card or smartphone application notably on Samsung Player One (with the same mobile phone operators than in Caen and Strasbourg in 2007), as well as the validation aboard with them of the transport titles and the loading of these titles onto the smartphone, in addition to the season tickets contactless card. This service was as well experimented then respectively implemented for NFC smartphones on 18 and 25 June 2013 in the tramways and bus of Caen and Strasbourg., after the contactless payment on the 765 pay and display parking machines of Strasbourg was made available in October 2011. In the Paris transport network, after a 4 months testing from November 2006 with Bouygues Telecom and 43 persons and finally with 8,000 users from July 2018, the contactless mobile payment and direct validation on the turnstile readers with a smartphone was adopted on 25 September 2019 in collaboration with the societies Orange, Samsung, Wizway Solutions, Worldline and Conduent.

NFC is used in Seoul after its introduction in Korea by the discount retailer Homeplus in March 2010 and in Tokyo it is tested then adopted or added to the existing systems, like the mobile wallet Osaifu-Keitai, from May 2010 to end of 2012. The NFC standard is implemented for the first time in a metro network, by China Unicom in Beijing on 31 December 2010.

In October 2011, the first mobile phones with Mastercard PayPass and/or Visa payWave certification appeared. A PayPass or payWave account can be assigned to the embedded secure element and/or SIM card within the phones.

In October 2013, Citi Enterprise Payments and  3 Hong Kong, the mobile operation of Hutchison Telecommunications Hong Kong Holdings Limited (SEHK: 215), jointly announced the launch of ‘3 Citi Wallet.’  Using Near Field Communication (NFC) technology, the '3 Citi Wallet' was a multi-purpose mobile wallet service that included mobile payment, transaction history, a location-based special offer service and a search function that directed customers to the best deals within their vicinity.  The 3Citi wallet was compatible with a wide range of designated smartphones, from Samsung, Sony, HTC, LG and iPhone. Over 9,000 Visa payWave readers across Hong Kong were able to accept contactless payments on Day 1.

In February 2014, Mastercard announced that it would partner with Weve, which is a joint venture between EE, Telefónica UK, and Vodafone UK, to focus on mobile payments. The partnership will promote the development of "contactless mobile payment systems" by creating a universal platform in Europe for it.

On 9 September 2014, Apple Inc. announced Apple Pay, a proprietary form of contactless payment integrated with its smartphones, with the release of the iPhone 6.

In September 2014, Transport for London's Tube began accepting contactless payment. TfL are claiming that they pushed the banking industry to develop the contactless system. See the tv programme Secrets of the London Underground Series 2 Episode 9 (around minute 58).The number of completed contactless journeys has now exceeded 300m. On Friday 18 December, the busiest single day in 2015, a record 1.24m journeys were completed by over 500k unique contactless cards.

In 2016 Erste Group launched an NFC-only debit card implemented as a sticker in Austria. It can be used at any NFC supporting terminal for transactions of unlimited amount however for transactions over the floor limit of €25 a PIN is required to confirm the transaction.

In 2016, contactless payments start to become even broader with wearable technology devices also offering this payment feature.

2020s

During the COVID-19 pandemic, several banks raised their contactless payment limits. In the United Kingdom, the limit was increased from £30 to £45 in March 2020. Contactless payments were recommended as a safer payment method compared to Chip and PIN card payments and cash transactions. It was later raised to £100.

Adoption and usage
Google Pay is an application for devices running Google's Android OS, which allows users to make purchases using NFC, which initially required a physical secure element but this was replaced by host card emulation which was introduced in Android 4.4 (KitKat). Softcard (formerly known as Isis mobile wallet), Cityzi and Quick Tap wallets for example, use a secure SIM card to store encrypted personal information. Contactless payments with enabled mobile phones still occur on a small scale, but every month an increasing number of mobile phones are certified.

In 2012, Mastercard Advisors wrote that consumers are likely to spend more money using their cards due to the ease of small transactions. Mastercard Canada says it has seen "about 25 percent" higher spending by users of its Mastercard Contactless-brand RFID credit cards.

, there were approximately 58 million contactless-enabled cards in use in the UK, and over 147,000 terminals in use.  By June 2017 purchases made by card surpassed those made by cash. This was reported to have been driven by the rise in contactless payments, which accounted for approximately one third of all card transactions in the UK. The number of payments by this method had increased significantly since the spending limit was raised from £20 to £30. In 2018, contactless payments made up around 19% of transactions in the UK.

In 2018, the Westpac Banking Corporation in Australia revealed contactless payment statistics from 2017 and claimed in the report that contactless payments approached saturation point by being used in over 90% of purchases. The Australian St.George Bank reported 94.6% usage for the same period.

Recent statements by Visa and other US card issuers indicate that they will increase the availability of contactless cards to US consumers in the near future. Visa estimates there will be 300 million contactless cards issued in the US by the end of 2020, up from the predicted 100 million at the end of 2019 as announced on its 2018 Q4 earnings call.

Telecom operators are starting to get involved in contactless payments via the use of NFC-enabled phones. Belgacom's Pingping, for example, has a stored value account and via a partnership with Alcatel-Lucent's Touchatag provides contactless payment functionalities.

Major financial entities now offering contactless payment systems include Mastercard, China UnionPay, Citibank, JPMorgan Chase, American Express, KeyBank, Barclays, Barclaycard, HSBC, Lloyds Banking Group, FreedomPay, RuPay, The Co-operative Bank, Nationwide Building Society and NatWest Group. Visa payWave, American Express Expresspay, and Mastercard Contactless are examples of contactless credit cards which have become widespread in the U.S. and U.K.

Technology 
There are two main standard usages for contactless payments adopted throughout payment terminals with the EMV standard.

EMV Chip

On issued bank cards a smart chip or cryptographic chip is placed on the card known as a smart card which allows wireless payments to be made from the EMV chip in range of a payment terminal using RFID technology following the EMVCo standard. When the smart card is tapped against a payment terminal that authenticates the card issuer's details through a series of PIN interactions the payment for the interaction will succeed.

Tokenisation

A newer approach to smart card technology is achieved by linking a smart card to a hardware device, such as through the Apple Pay application on an iPhone mobile phone, thereby allowing mobile devices the ability to make payments using RFID technology against a payment terminal on behalf of a smart card using a token generated by the card issuer, a process known as tokenisation. A Device Account Number (DAN) similar to a Private Account Number (PAN) in traditional payment stripe and chip cards, is generated along with a private key and sent to the card issuer during initial setup of the smart card on the hardware device. When payments are made via the respective approved application on the hardware device the DAN and relevant details such as expiry date and CVV are sent to the card issuer via a payment terminal for cryptography where the associated private key is then used to authorise the transaction.

NFC

The near field communication (NFC, compliant with ISO/IEC 14443 standard) technology in contactless cards uses a 13.56Mhz radio frequency technology that only transmits digital data within a concise range.

Typically the optimum distance is 4 centimetres or less - beyond, the signal is rapidly decreasing and can never exceed 10 centimetres.

Security
In 2006 security researchers found that the cardholder's name, credit card number, and expiration date may be transmitted by contactless payment cards without encryption. They were able to use information leaked from a contactless credit card to make a purchase online, without opening the envelope in which the card was sent.

Depending on the economic space, there may be a payment limit on single transactions without the need to input the PIN, and some contactless cards can only be used a certain number of times before customers are asked for their PIN. Contactless debit and credit transactions use the same chip and PIN network as older cards and are protected by the same fraud guarantees. Where PIN is supported, the contactless part of the card may remain non-functional until a standard chip and PIN transaction has been executed. This provides some verification that the card was delivered to the actual cardholder.

Under fraud guarantee standards, U.S. banks are liable for any fraudulent transactions charged to the contactless cards.

CVM limit
Because no signature or PIN verification is typically required, contactless purchases are often limited to a maximum amount per transaction, known as a Cardholder Verification Limit (CVM limit). Limits vary between banks.  For transactions over the defined CVM limit a verification is usually required (e.g. PIN, signature, or biometric authentication).

Transactions under the floor limit, in addition to not requiring consumer authentication, are also accepted without sending the transaction online for verification by the acquiring host.

Note that these limits typically do not apply when CDCVM verification (such as in Apple Pay) is used.

See also

 Apple Pay
 Digital currency
 Contactless smart card
 Cashless society and reducing disease transmittal
 Dashtop mobile
 Google Pay
 Microsoft Pay
 Mobile payment
 Near field communication
 Proximity card
 Octopus card
 OPUS card
 Oyster card
 Opal card
 Presto card
 Rav-Kav
 Ventra
 Samsung Pay
 Softcard (formerly Isis mobile wallet)
 Vicinity cards

References

External links
 A Comprehensive Technical Overview of Contactless
  is designed to provide information for UK retailers that have an interest in Contactless card acceptance]
 New credit cards pose security problem, CBC News
 Chase's "blink" uses RFID

Banking technology
EMV
Mobile payments
Payment cards
Payment systems
Radio-frequency identification
Wearable devices